Nachikinskoe, or Nachikinskoye, Nachikinsky, is a rural settlement in the Yelizovsky District of Kamchatka Krai, Russia.
The administrative center is the village of Sokoch.

History

A highway built from Petropavlovsk-Kamchatsky towards the village of Nachiki improved communications, and on 5 September 1944 Milka and Nachiki were transferred to the administrative region of the city of Petropavlovsk-Kamchatsky.
On 12 February 1956 a general meeting was attended by 64 of the 72 adults who lived in the Malka village.
It was decided to abolish the Malkinsky Village Council and make Malka part of the Nachikinsky Village Council.

The settlement was established in 1947 on the Plotnikova River. 
In the early 1970s, the main Kamchatka road connected Petropavlovsk-Kamchatsky, first with the district center of Milkovo, and then with Atlasovo and the Ust-Kamchatsky District.
Most of the road runs between the Eastern and Sredinny (or Middle) ranges.
It crosses many rivers and streams along its length.

The present status and boundaries of the rural settlement were established by the Law of Kamchatka Region dated December 29, 2004 No. 255 "On Establishing the Borders of Municipalities Located in the Yelizovsky District of the Kamchatka Region, and on Giving them the Status of a Municipal District, Urban, and Rural Settlement".

Population

The Russian Census (2010) determined that the population of the rural settlement was 1304.
This was divided between five villages:

As of 2018 the population was 1265.

Lake

The rural settlement contains the glacier-fed Nachikinskoye Lake (Ozero Nachikinskoye), the source of the Plotnikova River.
It is an important spawning ground for sockeye salmon, coho salmon and pink salmon. 
During the spawning period the plentiful fish attract many brown bears.
A study of charrs of the genus Salvelinus in the lake showed that two populations of closely related but morphologically distinct sympatric charrs can stably coexist in the lake.

Citations

Sources

 

Rural localities in Kamchatka Krai